"Not in Love" is a song by Canadian new wave band Platinum Blonde, from the band's 1983 debut album Standing in the Dark. It was released as a 7" single in October 1984 through CBS.

Track listing
Canadian 7" single
A. "Not in Love" – 3:59
B. "Video Disease" – 3:43

Personnel
Platinum Blonde
Sergio Galli – guitar, vocals
Mark Holmes – bass, keyboards
Chris Steffler – drums, percussion

Technical personnel
David Tickle – engineering, production

Charts

Crystal Castles version

In 2010, "Not in Love" was covered by Canadian electronic duo Crystal Castles for their second studio album, Crystal Castles II. A single version, which features Robert Smith of The Cure on lead vocals, was released as the third single from Crystal Castles via their YouTube channel on October 26, 2010. The song was featured in the mid-season finale of the eleventh season of Degrassi, as well as in FIFA 12, the final episode of Colombian television series Crime Diaries: Night Out and in the South Korean television series Shut Up Flower Boy Band, where it was performed by Lee Min-ki.

Track listing
UK digital single
"Not in Love" (featuring Robert Smith) – 3:49
"Not in Love" (Robert Smith Mix featuring Robert Smith) – 3:49

Charts

Certifications

Release history

References

1984 singles
2010 singles
CBS Records singles
Platinum Blonde (band) songs
Crystal Castles (band) songs
1984 songs
Fiction Records singles